"Nej se det snöar" is a Swedish children's song with lyrics and music by Felix Körling. It was originally published in 1913 in Kisse-Misse-Måns och andra visor, entitled "Hurra för vintern!".

The song lyrics describe, from a child's perspective, the happiness and expectations during the first snowfall of winter.

Recording
A recording with Peter Himmelstrand was released in 1978. Agnetha Fältskog and her daughter Linda Ulvaeus recorded the song on their 1981 Christmas album Nu tändas tusen juleljus.

References

1913 songs
Swedish children's songs
Swedish-language songs